MLS International Roster Slots are an important piece of roster composition in Major League Soccer. MLS employs a variety of mechanisms to promote parity and domestic player development which include player entry drafts, expansion drafts, allocation drafts, weighted lotteries, and a limit on the number of international roster slots available for each team. The limit on the number of international roster slots makes each slot a valuable commodity for teams to utilize through player signings or trades with other teams.

The MLS roster rules for 2019 state:
 A total of 192 international roster slots are divided among the 24 teams. In 2008, each MLS team was given the right to have eight international players on its roster and each subsequent expansion teams were given the right to have eight international roster slots for its inaugural season. These roster slots are tradable, in full season increments, such that some teams may have more than eight and some teams may have fewer than eight. There is no limit on the number of international roster slots on each team's roster.
 For teams based in the United States, a domestic player is either:
 a U.S. citizen;
 a permanent resident (green card holder); or
 the holder of other special status (e.g., has been granted refugee or asylum status); or
 a player who qualifies under the Homegrown International Rule.
 For teams based in Canada, a domestic player is either:
 a Canadian citizen; or
 the holder of certain other special status (e.g., has been granted refugee or asylum status); or
 a player who qualifies under the Homegrown International Rule; or
 a U.S. Domestic Player.
 MLS teams based in Canada are required to have a minimum of three Canadian Domestic Players on their rosters.
 Homegrown International Rule: regardless of nationality, any player who meets the requirements to qualify as a Homegrown Player as a member of an MLS team academy, either in the U.S. or Canada, or has met similar requirements as a member of a Canadian Approved Youth Club, will count as a domestic player on both U.S. and Canadian team rosters provided that:
 the player became a member of an MLS team academy, either in the U.S. or Canada, or a Canadian Approved Youth Club in the year prior to the year in which he turns 16; and
 the player signs his first professional contract with MLS or an MLS team's USL affiliate.

Source:

Current international roster slots by team

Key
 DL – Player is on the disabled list (DL) and does not occupy international slot while on the DL
 L – Player is away on loan and does not occupy international slot while out on loan
 SEIL – Player is on the season-ending injury list (SEIL) and does not occupy international slot while on the SEIL

Active international roster slot trades

Future international roster slot trades

References

Major League Soccer rules and regulations
Association football terminology